This list of American art awards covers some of the main art awards given by organizations in the United States. Some are restricted to Visual artists of the United States in a particular genre or from a given region, while others are broader in scope.

Awards

See also
Lists of art awards

References

United Statesme
American